In applied mathematics, the transfer matrix is a formulation in terms of a block-Toeplitz matrix of the two-scale equation, which characterizes refinable functions. Refinable functions play an important role in wavelet theory and finite element theory.

More verbosely

The effect of  can be expressed in terms of the downsampling operator "":

Properties

 .
 If you drop the first and the last column and move the odd-indexed columns to the left and the even-indexed columns to the right, then you obtain a transposed Sylvester matrix.
 The determinant of a transfer matrix is essentially a resultant.
More precisely:
Then , where  is the resultant.
This connection allows for fast computation using the Euclidean algorithm.
 For the trace of the transfer matrix of convolved masks holds

 For the determinant of the transfer matrix of convolved mask holds

where  denotes the mask with alternating signs, i.e. .
 If , then .
 This is a concretion of the determinant property above. From the determinant property one knows that  is singular whenever  is singular.
 ,
 .
There is an alternative possibility for computing the sum of eigenvalue powers, which is faster for small .
Then with the upsampling operator  it holds

Actually not  convolutions are necessary, but only  ones, when applying the strategy of efficient computation of powers. Even more the approach can be further sped up using the Fast Fourier transform.
It holds

where  is the size of the filter and if all eigenvalues are real, it is also true that
,
where .

See also
 Hurwitz determinant

References
 
  (contains proofs of the above properties)

Wavelets
Numerical analysis